An online discussion platform is an online platform that allows for, or is built specifically for, online discussion.

History 

In 1979 students from Duke University created the first online discussion platform with Usenet.

Uses
Online discussion platforms can engage people in collective reflection and exchanging perspectives and cross-cultural understanding.

Public display of ideas can encourage intersubjective meaning making.

Online discussion platforms may be an important structural means for effective large-scale participation.

In education

Online discussion platforms can play a role in education. In recent years, online discussion platform have become a significant part of not only distance education but also in campus-based settings.

The proposed interactive e-learning community (iELC) is a platform that engages physics students in online and classroom learning tasks. In brief classroom discussions fundamental physics formulas, definitions and concepts are  disclosed, after which students participate in the iELC form discussion and utilize chat and dialogue tools to improve their understanding of the subject. The teacher then discusses selected forum posts in the subsequent classroom session.

Classroom online discussion platforms are one type of such platforms.

Rose argues that the basic motivation for the development of e–learning platforms is efficiency of scale — teaching more students for less money.

A study found that learners will enhance the frequencies of course discussion and actively interact with e-learning platform when e-learning platform integrates the curriculum reward mechanism into learning activities.

In smart cities
"City townhall" includes a participation platform for policy-making in Rotterdam.

In 2022, United Nations reported that D-Agree Afghanistan is used as a digital and smart city solutions in Afghanistan.   D-Agree, is a discussion support platform with artificial intelligence–based facilitation. The discussion trees in D-Agree, inspired by issue-based information system, contain a combination of four types of elements: issues, ideas, pros, and cons. The software extracts a discussion's structure in real time based on IBIS, automatically classifying all the sentences.

Streamlining
Online discussion platforms may be designed and improved to streamline discussions for efficiency, usefulness and quality. For instance voting, targeted notifications, user levels, gamification, subscriptions, bots, discussion requirements, structurization, layout, sorting, linking, feedback-mechanisms, reputation-features, demand-signaling features, requesting-features, visual highlighting, separation, curation, tools for real-time collaboration, tools for mobilization of humans and resources, standardization, data-processing, segmentation, summarization, moderation, time-intervals, categorization/tagging, rules and indexing can be leveraged in synergy to improve the platform.

In 2013 Sarah Perez claimed that the best platform for online discussion doesn't yet exist, noting that comment sections could be more useful if they showed "which comments or shares have resonated and why" and which "understands who deserves to be heard".

Online platforms don't intrinsically guarantee informed citizen input. Research demonstrates that such spaces can even undermine deliberative participation when they allow hostile, superficial and misinformed content to dominate the conversation (see also: Internet troll, shitposting). A necessary mechanism that enables these platforms to yield informed citizen debate and contribution to policy is deliberation. It is argued that the challenge lies in creating an online context that does not merely aggregate public input but promotes informed public discussion that may benefit the policy-making process.

Online citizen communication has been studied for an evaluations of how deliberative their content is and how selective perception and ideological fragmentation play a role in them (see also: filter bubble).
One sub-branch of online deliberation research is dedicated to the development of new platforms that "facilitate deliberative experiences that surpass currently available options".

See also

References

Social information processing
Computer-mediated communication
Web 2.0
Collaborative software
Online services